Dixie Caverns is a commercial show cave located in the Riverside community of Roanoke County, Virginia, USA, four miles west of Salem. The cave is a limestone solution cave.

Description and access 
Visitors may explore the caverns in a 45-minute guided tour.  The caverns were found by two farm boys in 1920 after their dog, Dixie, fell through a hole that led to the caves.   They decided to name the caverns after their dog in honor of his discovery.   Guided tours of the caverns were begun in 1923.  The best known attraction is a bell-shaped flowstone formation known as the "Wedding Bell".  Weddings have been held under the Bell.  The cave is located in a hill overlooking the surrounding region.

External links 
 Dixie Caverns website

Caves of Virginia
Show caves in the United States
Limestone caves
Landforms of Roanoke County, Virginia
Tourist attractions in Roanoke County, Virginia